Nereina punctulata is a species of freshwater snail with an operculum, an aquatic gastropod mollusk in the family Neritidae, the nerites.

Distribution 
Distribution of Nereina punctulata include:
 Puerto Rico
 Dominica

Ecology 
Nereina punctulata lives in rivers.

The estimation of the lifespan is at least 3–7 years. Neritina punctulata migrates upstream during lifespan.

It is a grazer, that feeds on algae. It is dominant grazer in Río Mameyes.

References

 Lamarck J.B. (1816). Liste des objets représentés dans les planches de cette livraison. In: Tableau encyclopédique et méthodique des trois règnes de la Nature. Mollusques et Polypes divers. Agasse, Paris. 16 pp.
 Eichhorst T.E. (2016). Neritidae of the world. Volume 1. Harxheim: Conchbooks. 695 pp.

External links
 Crosse, H. & Fischer, P. (1893). Diagnoses Molluscorum Republicae Mexicanae et Guatemalae incolarum. Journal de Conchyliologie. 40(3): 294-296

Neritidae
Taxa named by Jean-Baptiste Lamarck
Gastropods described in 1816